San Juan Bautista Cuicatlán  is a town and municipality in Oaxaca in south-western Mexico. The municipality covers an area of  543.5 km². 
It is part of Cuicatlán District in the north of the Cañada Region.

As of 2005, the municipality had a total population of 9181.

The education system in Cuicatlán consists solely of public schools. There are 12 pre-schools, 18 primary schools, two secondary schools, and one high school in the municipality of Cuicatlán. Four out of the 12 pre-schools are bilingual as well as two of the primary schools.

Cuicatlán hosts its patron saint festival (Saint John the Baptist) the 24th of June, with festivities occurring the entire week in the central park including dances, fireworks, rodeos, and basketball games. Other major fiestas include Day of the Dead (October 31 – November 2), Semana Santa (Easter), and Christmas.

Located just outside the city center is the Cuicatlán Botanical Garden, which offers quaint trails that meander through a dry tropical forest. The Botanical Garden also offers gazebos and a kitchen for hosting events, and will house the Cuicatlán Archeological Museum, which is currently under construction.

Cuicatlán is neighbor to several ecotourism hot spots including San Jose De Chilar, Santiago Quiotepec, and Santa Maria Tecomovaca. These site offer green macaw sightseeing tours, guided nature walks, hiking, mountain biking, horseback ridings, kayaking, cabins, camp grounds, and ancient runes.

Cuicatlán is home to the world-famous chilhuacle, or chili huatle pepper, which is in season only in late August and September. Local people use this chili pepper to make typical dishes such as chile caldo. Other typical dishes of Cuicatlán include mole negro, mole rojo, salsa de chicatana (ants) which are only available during the early summer months.

References

Municipalities of Oaxaca